The Chesapeake Shakespeare Company (CSC) is a theatre company based in Baltimore, Maryland. Founded in 2002, by Ian Gallanar and Heidi Busch-Gallanar, the Chesapeake Shakespeare Company has grown into one of the twenty largest Shakespeare theaters in the United States under the leadership of Founding Artistic Director Ian Gallanar and Managing Director Lesley Malin. The Chesapeake Shakespeare Company has performance spaces in Baltimore and Elliott City, Maryland. Its main indoor space, the Chesapeake Shakespeare Company Theater opened in 2014 after a $7M renovation of the Mercantile Bank Building, a site listed on the National Register of Historic Places. In addition, The Studio, is located next door on the fourth floor of the Merchants Club space and is used for educational programs, rehearsals and as an alternate performance space for CSC. They continue to perform outdoor every summer at the Patapsco Female Institute Historic Park in Ellicott City, Maryland.

The Chesapeake Shakespeare Company is listed as a Major Festival in the book Shakespeare Festivals Around the World by Marcus D. Gregio (Editor), 2004.

Notable projects over the years include participation as the only Maryland Company in 2007's international Shakespeare in Washington Festival with their productions of As You Like It and Henry V, a 2007 production of Macbeth that performed at the Patuxent Institution, a maximum security prison based in Jessup, Maryland, the 2014 Maryland debut of Shakespeare's Richard II, Wild Oats, a rare 18th Century play and their own Baltimore themed adaptation of A Christmas Carol (adapted by Founder and Artistic Director Ian Gallanar) running every December from 2014 - 2019. In 2017, the Chesapeake Shakespeare Company hosted the international Shakespeare Theatre Association conference.

The Chesapeake Shakespeare Company's education programs include professional artist development, community education, innovative K-12 school programming, summer camps for kids, high school Shakespeare Festivals and workshops using methodologies created by CSC in cooperation with National and International Institutional Partners.

Production history
2002 Twelfth Night Directed by Ian Gallanar

2003 Romeo and Juliet Directed by Ian Gallanar

2003 The Comedy of Errors Directed by Christopher Marino

2004 Troilus & Cressida Directed by Patrick Kilpatrick

2004 Much Ado About Nothing Directed by Ian Gallanar

2004 Measure for Measure Directed by Christopher Niebling

2005 The Dog in the Manger by Lope de Vega Directed by Isabelle Anderson

2005 A Midsummer Night's Dream Directed by Ian Gallanar

2005 Coriolanus Directed by Ian Gallanar

2006 The Imaginary Invalid by Molière Directed by Ken Elston

2006 King Lear Directed by Ian Gallanar

2006 The Taming of the Shrew Directed by Patrick Kilpatrick

2006 Love's Labor's Lost Directed by Jenny Leopold

2007 The Front Page Directed by Ian Gallanar

2007 As You Like It Directed by Ian Gallanar

2007 Henry V Directed by James Ricks

2007 Macbeth Directed by Ian Gallanar

2008 A Doll's House by Henrick Ibsen Directed by Kevin Costa

2008 The Comedy of Errors Directed by Ian Gallanar

2008 The Tempest Directed by Patrick Kilpatrick

2008 Macbeth Directed by Ian Gallanar

2009 The Country Wife Directed by Heather Nathans

2009 Cyrano de Bergerac Directed by Ian Gallanar

2009 Twelfth Night Directed by Jenny Leopold

2009 Julius Caesar Directed by Frank Moorman

2010 Lysistrata Directed by Ian Gallanar

2010 Much Ado About Nothing Directed by Ryan Whinnem

2010 Hamlet Directed by Ian Gallanar

2010 Titus Andronicus Directed by Kevin Costa

2011 Cymbeline Directed by Ian Gallanar

2011 A Midsummer Night's Dream Directed by Ian Gallanar

2011 The Complete Works of William Shakespeare (Abridged) Directed by Scott Alan Small

2011 Our Town Directed by Ian Gallanar

2012 The Merchant of Venice Directed by Teresa Castracane

2012 Romeo and Juliet Directed by Jenny Leopold

2012 Pride and Prejudice Directed by Isabelle Anderson

2012 Richard III Directed by Ian Gallanar

2013 The Two Gentlemen of Verona Directed by Patrick Kilpatrick

2013 The Taming of the Shrew Directed by Ian Gallanar

2013 Antony and Cleopatra Directed by Ralph Alan Cohen

2013 Dracula Directed by Scott Alan Small

2014 As You Like It Directed by Patrick Kilpatrick

2014 A Midsummer Night's Dream Directed by Ian Gallanar

2014 Richard II Directed by Kevin Costa

2014 A Christmas Carol Directed by Ian Gallanar

2015 Uncle Vanya Directed by Ian Gallanar

2015 The Importance of Being Earnest Directed by Erin Bone Steele

2015 Romeo and Juliet Directed by Ian Gallanar

2015 The Comedy of Errors Directed by Scott Alan Small

2015 Much Ado About Nothing Directed by Matthew R. Wilson

2015 Titus Andronicus Directed by Ian Gallanar

2015 A Christmas Carol Directed by Ian Gallanar & Scott Alan Small

2016 Wild Oats Directed by Ian Gallanar

2016 Macbeth Directed by Paul Barnes

2016 The Three Musketeers Directed by Patrick Kilpatrick & Ian Gallanar

2016 Othello Directed by Ian Gallanar

2016 Anne of the Thousand Days Directed by Kasi Campbell

2016 A Christmas Carol By Ian Gallanar Directed by Scott Alan Small

2017 Richard III Directed by Ian Gallanar

2017 The Taming of the Shrew Directed by Ian Gallanar

2017 The Fantasticks! by Schmidt & Jones Directed by Curt Tofteland

2017 The Tempest Directed by Lizzi Albert

2017 Julius Caesar Directed by Michael Toylado

2017 A Christmas Carol By Ian Gallanar Directed by Scott Alan Small

2018 Red Velvet by Lolita Chakrabarti Directed by Shirley Basfield-Dunlap

2018 The Winter's Tale Directed by Isabelle Anderson

2018 Alice in Wonderland by Florida Friebus & Eva Le Gallienne Directed by Ian Gallanar

2018 A Midsummer Night's Dream Directed by Gerrad Taylor

2018 She Stoops to Conquer by Oliver Goldsmith Directed by Ian Gallanar

2018 A Christmas Carol By Ian Gallanar Directed by Gerrad Taylor

2019 Henry IV Part 1 Directed by Ian Gallanar

2019 Henry IV Part 2 Directed by Ian Gallanar and Gerrad Taylor

2019 The Diary of Anne Frank by Goodrich & Hackett Directed by Eve Muson

2019 Macbeth Directed by Ian Gallanar

2019 Love's Labour's Lost Directed by Erin Bone Steele

2019 Dracula by Steven Deitz Directed by Gerrad Taylor

2019 A Christmas Carol by Ian Gallanar Directed by Scott Alan Small

2020 Measure for Measure Directed by Lisa Bruneau

2020 The Complete Works of William Shakespeare (Abridged) by Adam Long, Daniel Singer, and Jess Winfield Directed by Ian Gallanar

See also
 Theater in Maryland
 Shakespeare in Washington Festival

References

External links
 Official Website of Chesapeake Shakespeare Company
 Shakespeare in Washington Festival

Ellicott City, Maryland
Theatres in Maryland
Theatre companies in Maryland
Tourist attractions in Howard County, Maryland
2002 establishments in Maryland